Time Waits for No Slave is the thirteenth studio album by the British grindcore band Napalm Death. It was released through Century Media on 23 January 2009.

Track listing

Personnel

Napalm Death
 Mark "Barney" Greenway – lead vocals
 Mitch Harris – guitars, backing vocals
 Shane Embury – bass, backing vocals
 Danny Herrera – drums

Production
 Napalm Death – arrangement, producer
 Russ Russell – producer, engineering, mixing, mastering
 Mick Kenney – outside illustration
 Kevin Sharp – inside illustration
 Carsten Drescher – layout
 Hugo Chevalier – band photo (Herrera)
 ccphotoart.biz – band photos (other band members)

Chart positions

References

2009 albums
Napalm Death albums
Century Media Records albums